A constitutional referendum was held in Chad and Ubangi-Shari on 5 May 1946 as part of the wider French constitutional referendum. The proposed new constitution was rejected by 65.9% of voters, with a turnout of 59.9%.

Results

References

1946 referendums
1946
1946 in Ubangi-Shari
1946
1946 in Chad
1946
Referendums in Ubangi-Shari
Constitutional referendums in France
May 1946 events in Africa